Stone Johnson (September 9, 1918 – January 19, 2012) was an African-American activist in the Civil Rights Movement. A railway worker and union representative by trade, he got involved in the civil rights movement in Birmingham, Alabama in the mid 1950s, working with Fred Shuttlesworth. He started a civil rights organization called the Civil Rights Guards that protected homes and business involved in the movement, usually while armed.

Johnson was born in Lowndes County, Alabama to Fannie and Colonel Johnson. His family moved to Birmingham when he was 4.  Graduating from Lincoln High School in 1939, he was hired at Louisville & Nashville Railroad Company, where he worked for nearly 40 years. He claimed to be the first black union representative for the company in Birmingham.

Johnson may be best known for having helped to carry a Ku Klux Klan bomb away from Bethel Baptist Church in Birmingham, AL.  He also provided armed protection to nonviolent activists in Anniston, Alabama during the 1961 Freedom Rides, rescuing them from a segregationist mob. He also served for a time as vice-president of the Birmingham chapter of the Southern Christian Leadership Conference.

An oft-repeated remark of Johnson, when asked how he'd managed to protect civil rights leaders given his commitment to nonviolence, Johnson replied, "With my nonviolent .38 special."

In 2011, the city of Birmingham dedicated a street in his honor.

References

1918 births
2012 deaths
American civil rights activists